The Ukrainian SL Favorit Sport was one of two top-tier level professional basketball leagues in Ukraine. The league existed for one season, and was organised by the Ukrainian Basketball Federation.

History
At the start of the 2015–16 season, the SL Favorit Sport league was founded, and several teams from the Ukrainian SuperLeague, including the league's champions, Khimik, left the Ukrainian SuperLeague and joined the newly formed Ukrainian SL Favorit Sport league. After the 2015–16 season, the two leagues merged again.

Teams
As of the 2015-2016 season the following team participated:

Finals

See also
 Ukrainian SuperLeague

References

External links
 Official Ukrainian Basketball Federation Website 
 Ukrainian SL Favorit Sport at Eurobasket.com 

 
Basketball leagues in Ukraine